Callipulli Airport,  was a rural airstrip  east of Osorno, a city in the Los Lagos Region of Chile.

Google Earth Historical Imagery shows the  grass airstrip was converted to cropland between (1/5/2003) and (12/27/2010).

See also

Transport in Chile
List of airports in Chile

References

External links 

Defunct airports
Airports in Los Lagos Region